Mary, Lady Stewart (born Mary Florence Elinor Rainbow; 17 September 1916 – 9 May 2014) was a British novelist who developed the romantic mystery genre, featuring smart, adventurous heroines who could hold their own in dangerous situations. She also wrote children's books and poetry, but may be best known for her Merlin series, which straddles the boundary between the historical novel and fantasy.

Early life and education 
Mary Florence Elinor Rainbow was born on 17 September 1916 in Sunderland, County Durham, England, UK, daughter of Mary Edith Matthews, a primary school teacher from New Zealand, and Frederick Albert Rainbow, a vicar. 

She was a bright child and attended Eden Hall boarding school in Penrith, Cumbria, age eight. She was bullied there and stated that this had a lasting effect on her. At ten, she won a scholarship to Skellfield School, Ripon, Yorkshire, where she excelled at sport. Offered places by Oxford, Cambridge, and Durham universities, she chose Durham as it offered the largest bursary and least travel. 

She graduated from Durham University in 1938 with first-class honours in English, was awarded a first-class Teaching Diploma in English with Art the following year and in 1941 gained her master's degree.

Academic teaching 
The scarcity of jobs during World War II meant that she held a variety of posts during this period, including primary school teaching, teaching at secondary level at a girls' boarding school, and working part-time at the Sixth Form of Durham School. Between 1941 and 1956, she was an assistant lecturer (1941–5) and part-time lecturer (1948–56) in English literature, mostly Anglo-Saxon, at Durham University. She received an honorary D.Litt. in 2009. It was in Durham that she met and married her husband, Frederick Stewart, a young Scot who lectured in Geology. She became known as Mary Stewart.

In 1956, the couple moved to Edinburgh. Mary, in her own words, was a "born storyteller" and had been writing stories since the age of three. Following the move to Scotland, she submitted a novel to the publishers Hodder & Stoughton. Madam, Will You Talk? was an immediate success, followed by many other successful works over the years.

Writing career
Stewart was the best-selling author of many romantic suspense and historical fiction novels. They were well received by critics, due especially to her skillful story-telling and elegant prose. Her novels are also known for their well-crafted settings, many in England but also in such locations as Damascus and the Greek islands, as well as Spain, France, Austria, etc.

She was at the height of her popularity from the late 1950s to the 1980s, when many of her novels were translated into other languages. The Moon-Spinners, one of her most popular novels, was also made into a Disney live-action movie.  Stewart was one of the most prominent writers of the romantic suspense subgenre, blending romance novels and mystery. Critically, her works are considered superior to those of other acclaimed romantic suspense novelists, such as Victoria Holt and Phyllis Whitney. She seamlessly combined the two genres, maintaining a full mystery while focusing on the courtship between two people, so that the process of solving the mystery "helps to illuminate" the hero's personality—thereby helping the heroine to fall in love with him.

In the late 1960s a new generation of young readers revived a readership in T. H. White's The Once and Future King (published in full 1958) and The Lord of the Rings (published in full 1956), and as a consequence Arthurian and heroic legends regained popularity among a critical mass of readers. Mary Stewart added to this climate by publishing The Crystal Cave (1970), the first in what was to become The Merlin Trilogy, later extended by two further novels. The books placed Stewart on the best-seller list many times throughout the 1970s and 1980s.

Personal life 
Mary Rainbow met and married her husband, Frederick Stewart, a young Scot lecturer in Geology, whilst they were both working at Durham University. They were married by her father in September 1945 after having met at a VE Day dance; their engagement was announced in The Times only one month after they met. At 30, she suffered an ectopic pregnancy, undiagnosed for several weeks, and as a consequence could not have children.

In 1956, they moved to Edinburgh, where he became professor of geology and mineralogy, and later chairman of the Geology Department at University of Edinburgh. 

In 1974, Mary's husband Frederick Stewart was knighted and she became Lady Stewart, although she never used the title. Her husband died in 2001.

In semi-retirement Stewart resided in Edinburgh as well as near Loch Awe. An avid gardener, Mary and her husband shared a keen love of nature. She was also fond of her cat Tory, a black and white female, who lived to be eighteen.

Mary Stewart died on 9 May 2014. Her entry in the Oxford Dictionary of National Biography was added in 2022.

Awards

Fantasy genre

Mystery genre

Bibliography

Romantic suspense novels
Madam, Will You Talk? (1955)
Wildfire at Midnight (1956)
Thunder on the Right (1957)
Nine Coaches Waiting (1958)
My Brother Michael (1959)
The Ivy Tree (1961)
The Moon-Spinners (1962), filmed as The Moon-Spinners
This Rough Magic (1964)
Airs Above the Ground (1965)
The Gabriel Hounds (1967)
The Wind Off the Small Isles (1968)
Touch Not the Cat (1976)
Thornyhold (1988)
Stormy Petrel (1991)
Rose Cottage (1997)

The Merlin Chronicles
The Crystal Cave (1970)
The Hollow Hills (1973)
The Last Enchantment (1979)
The Wicked Day (1983)
The Prince and the Pilgrim (1995)

Children's novels
The Little Broomstick (1971) (adapted as the 2017 animated feature film Mary and the Witch's Flower)
Ludo and the Star Horse (1974)
A Walk in Wolf Wood (1980)
The Castle of Danger (1981) - children's version of Nine Coaches Waiting (1958)

Poetry
Frost on the Window: And other Poems (1990) (poetry collection)

References

Sources

Stewart, Mary (1973), About Mary Stewart, Ontario, Canada: Musson Book Company, 14 page booklet with no ISBN

External links

"Off the Page-Mary Stewart" 2010. Culture and literature series featuring a Scottish writer each week. In this episode, romance and historical novelist Mary Stewart discusses her natural passion for reading and writing, and the creation of her Merlin novels.
"Mary Stewart: A Teller of Tales" 2011. Article by Katherine Hall Page from Mystery Scene.
University of Rochester. "Interview with Mary Stewart" 1989. From Interviews with Authors of Modern Arthurian Literature.
"Novelist Mary Stewart's a Lady Like Antonia Fraser—by Title; and That Ends the Similarity" 1976. Early People magazine article by Fred Hauptfuhrer.
 
 

1916 births
2014 deaths
Writers of modern Arthurian fiction
English fantasy writers
English mystery writers
English historical novelists
English romantic fiction writers
Agatha Award winners
Alumni of St Hild's College, Durham
20th-century English novelists
20th-century English women writers
People from Sunderland
Writers from Tyne and Wear
British women short story writers
Women science fiction and fantasy writers
Women romantic fiction writers
Women mystery writers
English women novelists
English short story writers
Women historical novelists
20th-century British short story writers